Khanuk (also Romanized as Khānūk; also known as Khānūq) is a city in the Central District of Zarand County, Kerman Province, Iran.  At the 2006 census, its population was 3,582, in 854 families.

References

Populated places in Zarand County

Cities in Kerman Province